Bjorøyl is the first studio album by the Norwegian country band Åsmund Åmli Band. This album has as of June 2008 sold more than 20,000 copies.

Track listing
 Påskerally på riksveg nummer 9 (Vince Gill/Kostas/Stian Øvland)
 Sove på sofan (Brad Paisley/Chris DuBois/Stian Øvland)
 Bjorøyl (Glenn Martin/Stian Øvland
 Svaikaddefest (Marty Stuart/Stian Øvland
 Om du ein dag vil heimte (Alan Jackson/Stian Øvland
 Soppeslaget (Lester Flatt/Stian Øvland
 Brannmann Sam (Mack Vickery/Wayne Kemp/Stian Øvland
 Stomp og vatn (Eric Clapton/Danny Flowers/Stian Øvland
 Sundagskveld på boin (Neese/Bob McDill/Wayland Holyfield/Stian Øvland
 En hyllest til The Buckaroos
 Norheim café (George Strait/Gerry House/Devan O'Day/Stian Øvland

2003 albums
Åsmund Åmli Band albums